Rock Brook is a tributary of Beden Brook in Somerset County, New Jersey in the United States.

Course
It flows south through the town of Skillman, picking up several tributaries, until it enters a dammed section called Sylvan Lake.

Tributaries
Cat Tail Brook

Sister tributary
Pike Run

See also
List of rivers of New Jersey

References

External links
USGS Coordinates in Google Maps

Tributaries of the Raritan River
Rivers of New Jersey
Rivers of Somerset County, New Jersey